Uniautónoma Fútbol Club, or UAC, was a professional Colombian football club based in Barranquilla, that played in the Categoría Primera A until its 2015 season. They played their home games at the Estadio Metropolitano Roberto Meléndez. As its name implied, Uniautónoma FC was founded by the Universidad Autónoma del Caribe.

History

Uniautónoma FC was founded in 2011, after Atlético de la Sabana relocated from Sincelejo. However they themselves were founded after Córdoba moved from Montería.

The club won the Categoría Primera B title in 2013, and thus were promoted to the Categoría Primera A for 2014, where they remained for two years until their relegation at the end of the 2015 season. On 27 November 2015, the Universidad Autónoma del Caribe announced the club's dissolution in a release, arguing that the club represented a huge financial burden for the university and that the university's resources should be instead directed in their entirety toward its own missional objectives as an educational institution. Therefore, maintaining the club stopped being deemed as a priority for the institution. The club's affiliation rights (ficha) were sold to Orsomarso S.C. from Palmira, who began playing in the Categoría Primera B from 2016 onwards.

Stadium

Honours
Categoría Primera B:
Winners (1): 2013

Players

International players
In bold players who had international appearances for their country while playing for Uniautónoma.

  Andrés Roa (2013)
  Edgar Zapata (2014–15)
  Giovanni Hernández (2014)
  Javier Araújo (2014)
  José Amaya (2014–15)
  Martín Arzuaga (2013, 2014)
  Orlando Ballesteros (2011)
  Leonel Parris (2014)

Former players

Records

Most capped players
Source: BDFA

Top scorers
Source: BDFA

External links
 Club Official Website
 Universidad Autónoma del Caribe Official Site

References

Association football clubs established in 2011
Association football clubs disestablished in 2015
Defunct football clubs in Colombia
Football clubs in Colombia
Categoría Primera A clubs
Categoría Primera B clubs
2011 establishments in Colombia